Hugo R. Magnuson (May 23, 1900 – May 20, 2003) was an American businessman and politician. He founded the regional Hugo's grocery store chain. He was the mayor of the city of Grand Forks, North Dakota, from 1964 to 1972; he also served as a city council member for seventeen years.

Early life
Hugo Ragnar Magnuson was born in Parkers Prairie, Minnesota. He was one of six children (including Minnie, Ernest, Esther, Hans, and Alfred) born to Carl Victor Magnuson (1863–1949) and Mary Sjobeck Magnuson (1866–1961).

Career
He is best known for the chain of grocery stores which bears his name. He opened his first grocery outlet in Grand Forks in 1939 as a Pure Foods Store. For many years, Magnuson's stores carried the name Piggly Wiggly. That name was dropped in 1984, with the arrival of a new wholesaler, Nash Finch Company. Hugo's stores are located in eastern North Dakota and northwestern Minnesota.

Personal life
He was married to Dorothy (Swenson) Magnuson (1908–1989), with whom he had four children. The city of Grand Forks declared May 2000 as "Hugo Magnuson Month", in honor of his 100th birthday. Magnuson died three days before his 103rd birthday in 2003. He was buried at Memorial Park Cemetery in Grand Forks, North Dakota.

See also

 List of centenarians (businesspeople)
 List of centenarians (politicians and civil servants)
 List of mayors of Grand Forks, North Dakota

External links 

 History of Hugo's

References

1900 births
2003 deaths
20th-century American businesspeople
20th-century American politicians
American centenarians
American food company founders
American grocers
American Lutherans
Burials in North Dakota
Businesspeople from Minnesota
Businesspeople from North Dakota
Mayors of Grand Forks, North Dakota
Men centenarians
North Dakota city council members
People from Otter Tail County, Minnesota
Retail company founders
20th-century Lutherans